The constitution of the Russian Soviet Federative Socialist Republic from 1918, also called the Basic Law (Основной закон, Osnovnoy zakon) which governed the Russian Soviet Federative Socialist Republic, described the regime that assumed power in the October Revolution of 1917. This constitution, which was ratified soon after the Declaration Of Rights Of The Working And Exploited People, formally recognized the working class as the ruling class of Russia according to the principle of the dictatorship of the proletariat, therein making the Russian Soviet Republic the world's first constitutionally socialist state.

History
The ultimate aims of the state were outlined as: "the abolition of the exploitation of men by men, the entire abolition of the division of the people into classes, the suppression of exploiters, [and] the establishment of a socialist society." The constitution stated that a historic alliance had been formed between the workers and peasants, who together would govern the state through the soviets. The constitution explicitly denied political power to higher classes of Russian society or to those who supported the White armies in the Civil War (1918–21). To prevent the higher classes from re-claiming state power, the first article called for all workers and peasants to be armed and organized into a Red Army while the higher classes be fully disarmed.

Supreme power rested with the All-Russian Congress of Soviets, made up of deputies from local soviets across Russia. The steering committee of the Congress of Soviets—known as the Central Executive Committee—acted as the "supreme organ of power" between sessions of the congress and as the collective presidency of the state.

The congress elected the Council of People's Commissars (Sovnarkom, Sovet narodnykh kommissarov) as the administrative arm of the young government and defined its responsibilities as "general administration of the affairs of the state". (The Sovnarkom had exercised governmental authority from November 1917 until the adoption of the 1918 constitution July 10 by the Congress of Soviets.)

One of the first Soviet iterations of a perennial biblical phrase appeared in Article 18, which declares labour to be the duty of all citizens of the Republic, and sloganeers: 'He who does not work, neither shall he eat!'

Importantly, the 1918 Russian Constitution's main principles served as a precursor to the ensuing constitutions of both united and autonomous Soviet republics.  They were recognized as fundamental to the 1924 Soviet Constitution, which was the formative document of the Union of Soviet Socialist Republics.

See also
 
 Russian State (1918–1920)
 Decree on the system of government of Russia (1918)

References

External links
  Full Text of the 1918 Constitution of the R.S.F.S.R.
 English translation of the 1918 Constitution of the R.S.F.S.R.
 The Russian Constitution of 1918 reprinted in The Nation

1918
1918
1918 in law
1918 in Russia
Russian Soviet Federative Socialist Republic
Legal history of Russia
July 1918 events
1918 in politics
1918 documents